William "O'Neil" Spencer (November 25, 1909 – July 24, 1944) was a jazz drummer and singer. He is most known for his work in the John Kirby Sextet.

He began with work for Al Sears and from 1931 to 1936 he worked with the Mills Blue Rhythm Band. He joined Kirby's group in 1937, but had to leave for a time in 1941 due to tuberculosis. He rejoined in 1942 staying until 1943, but died soon after from the disease.

External links
[ All Music]
 O'Neil Spencer recordings at the Discography of American Historical Recordings.

1909 births
Jazz drummers
20th-century deaths from tuberculosis
1944 deaths
Place of birth missing
Place of death missing
20th-century drummers
Mills Blue Rhythm Band members
Tuberculosis deaths in New York (state)